Edward Bayly (1709-1785) was a clergyman in the Church of Ireland during the 18th century.

Bayly was educated at Trinity College, Dublin.  He was Chancellor of St Patrick's Cathedral, Dublin from 1766 to 1772; and Archdeacon of Dublin from 1772 until his death. He was also Dean of Ardfert from 1768 until his death.

References

Deans of Ardfert
Archdeacons of Dublin
Alumni of Trinity College Dublin
18th-century Irish Anglican priests
1785 deaths
1709 births